is a 1991 Japanese comedy film directed by Yoji Yamada. It stars Kiyoshi Atsumi as Torajirō Kuruma (Tora-san), and Hideko Yoshida as his love interest or "Madonna". Tora-san Confesses is the forty-fourth entry in the popular, long-running Otoko wa Tsurai yo series.

Cast
 Kiyoshi Atsumi as Torajirō
 Chieko Baisho as Sakura
 Hidetaka Yoshioka as Mitsuo (Sakura's son)
 Kumiko Goto as Izumi Oikawa (Mitsuo's girlfriend)
 Hideko Yoshida as Seikō
 Shimojo Masami as Kuruma Tatsuzō
 Chieko Misaki as Tsune Kuruma (Torajirō's aunt)
 Hisao Dazai as Boss (Umetarō Katsura)
 Gajirō Satō as Genkō
 Keiroku Seki as Ponshū

Critical appraisal
Series Director Yoji Yamada and Yoshitaka Asama were nominated for Best Screenplay at the Japan Academy Prize for their work on Tora-san Confesses. Other nominations for the film at the ceremony were Mitsuo Degawa for Best Art Direction and Isao Suzuki and Takashi Matsumoto for Best Sound. Kevin Thomas of the Los Angeles Times wrote that this entry "is a charmer, full of the sentiment, humor and compassion that made the Tora-san movies always the most popular attraction" at Japanese language cinemas in Los Angeles. The German-language site molodezhnaja gives Tora-san Confesses three out of five stars.

Availability
Tora-san Confesses was released theatrically on December 23, 1991. In Japan, the film was released on videotape in 1992 and 1996, and in DVD format in 2000 and 2005.

References

Bibliography

English

German

Japanese

External links
 Tora-san Confesses at www.tora-san.jp (official site)
 

1991 films
Films directed by Yoji Yamada
1991 comedy films
1990s Japanese-language films
Otoko wa Tsurai yo films
Japanese sequel films
Shochiku films
Films with screenplays by Yôji Yamada
Films set in Tottori Prefecture
1990s Japanese films